Gyrinus distinctus is a species of beetles belonging to the family Gyrinidae.

It is native to Europe.

References

Gyrinidae